T. superba may refer to:
 Terminalia superba, the superb terminalia, limba, afara or korina, a large tree species native to tropical western Africa
 Tillandsia superba, a plant species native to Bolivia and Ecuador

See also 
 Superba (disambiguation)